Mercantile Stores Company Inc. until 1998, was a traditional department store retailer operating 102 fashion apparel stores and 16 home fashion stores in 17 states.  The stores were operated under 13 different nameplates and varied in size, with the average store approximating .  Store names included Bacon's, Castner Knott, deLendrecie's, Gayfers, Glass Block, Hennessy's, J. B. White (also known as White's), The Jones Store Company, Joslins, Lion Store, Maison Blanche, McAlpin's, and Root's.

Each store offered a wide selection of merchandise with special emphasis placed on fashion apparel, accessories and fashion home furnishings.  This was aimed at middle and upper-middle income consumers.  In addition to its department store operations the company maintained a partnership position in five operating shopping center ventures.  Each of these centers had a retail outlet of the company.

The store chain was formed in 1914 out of the bankruptcy of H.B. Claflin & Company.  Its stores were separated into two store chains, Associated Dry Goods - with brands such as Lord & Taylor and Hengerer's - and Mercantile Stores Company.  In May 1998 Mercantile Stores was acquired by Dillard's of Little Rock, Arkansas, for $2.9 billion.  Later that year, Dillard's announced plans to sell off 26 of the newly acquired locations where there already were Dillard's stores to The May Department Stores Company and Proffitt's Inc.

References

Retail companies established in 1914
Defunct department stores based in Cincinnati
Retail companies disestablished in 1998
Fairfield, Ohio
1998 mergers and acquisitions